The 1988–89 BHL season was the seventh season of the British Hockey League, the top level of ice hockey in Great Britain. 10 teams participated in the league, and the Durham Wasps won the league title by finishing first in the regular season. The Nottingham Panthers were playoff champions.

Regular season

Playoffs

Group A

Group B

Semifinals
Whitley Warriors 6-8 Nottingham Panthers
Ayr Bruins 12-6 Durham Wasps

Final
Ayr Bruins 3-6 Nottingham Panthers

References

External links
Season on hockeyarchives.info

1
United
British Hockey League seasons